The AARP Movies for Grownups Award for Best Screenwriter is one of the AARP Movies for Grownups Awards presented annually by the AARP. The award honors a screenwriter over the age of 50 who has written an outstanding supporting screenplay for a film produced in a given year. The award for Best Screenwriter was first given in 2003, when the awards expanded beyond their initial categories of Best Movie for Grownups, Best Director, Best Actor, Best Actress, Best Documentary, Best Foreign Film, and Best Movie for Grownups Who Refuse to Grow Up.

Winners and Nominees

2000s

2010s

2020s

Writers with multiple nominations and wins

The following individuals received two or more Best Screenwriter awards:

The following individuals received multiple Best Screenwriter nominations:

Age superlatives

See also
 Academy Award for Best Original Screenplay
 Academy Award for Best Adapted Screenplay
 Academy Award for Best Story
 Golden Globe Award for Best Screenplay
 BAFTA Award for Best Original Screenplay
 BAFTA Award for Best Adapted Screenplay
 Independent Spirit Award for Best Screenplay
 Critics' Choice Movie Award for Best Screenplay
 Writers Guild of America Award for Best Original Screenplay
 Writers Guild of America Award for Best Adapted Screenplay

References

Screenwriter
Screenwriting awards for film
Awards established in 2003